Charles Cooke may refer to:

Charles Cooke (basketball) (born 1994), basketball player for the New Orleans Pelicans of the NBA
Sir Charles Cooke (MP for Grampound) (died 1721), merchant and politician
Charles A. Cooke (1848–1917), North Carolina Supreme Court justice
Charles Bowen Cooke (1859–1920), British locomotive engineer
Charles C. W. Cooke (born 1984), editor of National Review Online
Charles M. Cooke (1844–1920), North Carolina Secretary of State and legislator
Charles M. Cooke Jr. (1886–1970), U.S. admiral, commander of the 7th Fleet
Charles Montague Cooke (1849–1909), businessman and benefactor of educational institutions
Charles Montague Cooke Jr. (1874–1948), his son, American malacologist
Charles Wallwyn Radcliffe Cooke (1841–1911), British farmer, cider producer and Conservative politician

See also
Charles Cook (disambiguation)
Charlie Cooke (born 1942), Scottish footballer
Charles Fletcher-Cooke (1914–2001), British politician
Charles Cooke Hunt (1833–1868), explorer of Western Australia